The Vietnamese television mystery music game show Hidden Voices premiered the inaugural first season on HTV7 on 5 November 2016.

Gameplay

Format
Under the battle format, both opponents can eliminate one singer each in the first two rounds, and then both can choose one singer each to join the final performance in the third round. At the end of the game, the conditions for mystery singers chosen by opposing guest artists depending on the outcome of a final performance, if:

Rewards
If one guest artist has a good singer, he/she wins ₫50,000,000. In case of a tie (as both opponents have good singers), the same amount becomes split in half, leaving with ₫25,000,000 each. Both winning singers, regardless of being good or bad, receive ₫10,000,000 each.

Rounds
Each episode presents the opposing guest artists with seven people whose identities and singing voices are kept concealed until they are eliminated to perform on the "stage of truth" or remain in the end to perform the final duet.

Episodes (2016)

Guest artists

Episodes (2017)

Guest artists

Notes

References

Hidden Voices (game show)
2016 Vietnamese television seasons
2017 Vietnamese television seasons